Bezni-ye Cheragh Mardan (also Romanized as Beznī-ye Cherāgh Mardān; also known as Beznī-ye Laţīf) is a village in Charuymaq-e Shomalesharqi Rural District, in the Central District of Hashtrud County, East Azerbaijan Province, Iran. At the 2006 census, its population was 33, in 5 families.

References 

Towns and villages in Hashtrud County